Archduke Wenceslaus of Austria (9 March 1561 – 22 September 1578), was a German prince and member of the House of Habsburg. In 1577, he was appointed the Grand Prior of the Order of Malta in Castile. 
 
He was the son of Maximilian II, Holy Roman Emperor, and his wife, Maria of Spain.

Life
Born in Wiener Neustadt, Wenceslaus was the eleventh child and eighth son of his parents' sixteen children. Only nine of the children  survived early infancy. He grew up mostly in the court of Philip II of Spain with several of his siblings. In 1577, Wenceslaus was appointed Grand Prior of the Order of Malta in Castile, but died suddenly one year later in Madrid at age seventeen. He was buried in the Panteon de los Infantes in the Real Monasterio de San Lorenzo de El Escorial.

Ancestry

References

Richard Reifenscheid: Die Habsburger in Lebensbildern, Piper Verlag (2007).

Wenceslaus, Archduke of Austria
Wenceslaus, Archduke of Austria
16th-century House of Habsburg
Wenceslaus, Archduke of Austria
Knights of Malta
Austrian princes
Burials in the Pantheon of Infantes at El Escorial
Sons of emperors
Children of Maximilian II, Holy Roman Emperor
Sons of kings